Orissa Province was a province of British India created in April 1936 by the partitioning of the Bihar and Orissa Province. Its territory corresponds with the modern-day State of Odisha.

On 22 March 1912, both Bihar and Orissa divisions were separated from the Bengal Presidency as Bihar and Orissa Province. On 1 April 1936, Bihar and Orissa Province was split to form Bihar Province and Orissa Province. Parts of the Ganjam District and the Vizagapatam district of Madras Presidency were transferred to Orissa Province along with portions of the Vizagapatam Hill Tracts Agency and Ganjam Hill Tracts Agency.

History
In 1803 Orissa was occupied by forces of the British East India Company during the Second Anglo-Maratha War, coming in 1858 under direct administration by the British government along with the Company's other territories. Under the Raj, it was a division of the Bengal Presidency with its capital in Cuttack. It had an area of 35,664 km² and 5,003,121 inhabitants in 1901. The province included the Orissa Tributary States. On 1 April 1912, the province of Bihar and Orissa was detached from Bengal, and the Orissa Tributary States were placed under the authority of the governor of Bihar and Orissa. In 1936, Orissa became a separate province with five districts.

The Government of India Act provided for the election of a provincial legislative assembly and a responsible government. Elections were held in 1937, and the Indian National Congress took a majority of the seats but declined to form the government. A minority provisional government was formed under Krushna Chandra Gajapati, the Maharaja of Paralakhemundi.

The Congress reversed its decision and resolved to accept office in July 1937. Therefore, the Governor invited Bishwanath Das to form the government.

In November 1939, along with Congress ministries in other provinces, Das resigned in protest of the Governor-General's declaration of war on Germany without consulting with Indian leaders, and Orissa came under Governor's Rule till 1941 when Krushna Chandra Gajapati was again made the Premier. This government lasted till 1944.

Another round of elections were held in 1946, yielding another Congress majority, and a government was formed under Harekrushna Mahatab.

Governors 
 1 April 1936 – 11 August 1938 Sir John Austen Hubback (1st time) (b. 1878 – d. 1968) 
11 Aug 1938 –  8 December 1938 G. T. Boag (acting) (b. 1884 – d. 1969) 
 8 December 1938 –  1 April 1941 Sir John Austen Hubback (2nd time) (s.a.) 
 1 April 1941 –  1 April 1946 Sir William Hawthorne Lewis (b. 1888 – d. 1970) 
 1 April 1946 – 15 August 1947 Sir Chandulal Madhavlal Trivedi (b. 1893 – d. 1981)

Prime Ministers of Orissa 

 1 April 1937 – 19 July 1937 Maharaja Krushna Chandra Gajapati Narayan Deo (b. 1892 – d. 1974) Non-party (1st time)  
19 Jul 1937 –  4 November 1939 Bishwanath Das (b. 1889 – d. 1984) INC 
 4 November 1939 – 24 November 1941 Governor's Rule 
24 Nov 1941 – 29 June 1944 Maharaja Krushna Chandra Gajapati Narayan Deo (s.a.) Non-party (2nd time)  
29 Jun 1944 – 23 April 1946 Governor's Rule 
23 Apr 1946 – 15 August 1947 Harekrushna Mahatab (b. 1899 – d. 1987) INC

See also
Eastern States Agency
Orissa Tributary States

References

Provinces of British India
History of Odisha
Bengal Presidency